Julius Kruttschnitt (July 30, 1854 – June 15, 1925) was a German American railroad executive.

Biography
He was born on July 30, 1854 in New Orleans, Louisiana. He graduated from Washington and Lee University in 1873 and worked briefly as a schoolteacher before beginning his railroad career. He joined the Southern Pacific Railroad in 1885 and served in a variety of roles, culminating in chairman from 1913. 

He retired on May 31, 1925 as chairman of the executive committee of the Southern Pacific Railroad. He died on June 15, 1925 in New Orleans, Louisiana of a heart attack.

References

See also
List of Wells Fargo directors
Pecos River High Bridge

1854 births
1925 deaths
Southern Pacific Railroad people
American people of German descent
Washington and Lee University alumni

19th-century American businesspeople